The WTA Tier II tournaments were Women's Tennis Association tennis second-level tournaments held from 1990 until the end of the 2008 season. The line-up of events varied over the years, with tournaments being promoted, demoted or cancelled. 

From 2009 WTA Tour, WTA changed tournament categories, so that majority of Tier I and Tier II tournaments from the previous season are in one category, WTA Premier Tournaments.

Events

Results

1990

1991

1992

1993

1994

1995

1996

1997

1998

1999

2000

2001

2002

2003

2004

2005

2006

2007

2008

Singles Title Matrix

References

External links
https://www.grandslamhistory.com/atp/wta-tier-2

 Tier 2
Recurring sporting events established in 1990
Recurring sporting events disestablished in 2008